Elections to Leeds City Council were held on the same day as the general election, with one third of the council up for election and an additional vacancy in Garforth North and Barwick. There had also been a by-election in Horsforth for the seat up in this election, with the Conservatives successfully defending it.

The general election brought out a much higher turnout, with votes cast just over double  the average set by the prior elections. The Liberal's fuller slate of candidates for this election gained them a personal best, seemingly mainly at the Conservative's expense. Little advance was made from this, however, with their sole gain confined to winning the earlier mentioned Conservative-held Horsforth seat. Instead, Labour were the night's clear victors, with a total of five gains; four from the Conservatives (Burley, Kirkstall, and Morley North and Wortley) and Hunslet East and West from the Liberals.

This returned the council to no overall control, with one seat dividing the Conservatives and Labour.

Election result

This result has the following consequences for the total number of seats on the Council after the elections:

Ward results

References

1979 English local elections
1979
1970s in Leeds